Oscar Adolf Richard af Ström (8 July 1867 – 13 March 1952) was a Swedish Army officer and horse rider. He competed in the 1912 Summer Olympics and finished sixth in the individual dressage event on the horse Irish Lass.

af Ström became major in the reserve in 1930.

Awards and decorations
af Ström's awards:
Knight of the Order of the Sword
Knight of the Order of St John in Sweden
Knight Fourth Class of the Military Merit Order with crown
First Class of the Military Cross
Knight Third Class of the Order of the Crown
Knight of the Order of Leopold with war decoration

References

1867 births
1952 deaths
Swedish Army officers
Swedish dressage riders
Olympic equestrians of Sweden
Swedish male equestrians
Equestrians at the 1912 Summer Olympics
People from Solna Municipality
Knights of the Order of the Sword
Sportspeople from Stockholm County